APH-1 (anterior pharynx-defective 1) is a protein gene product originally identified in the Notch signaling pathway in Caenorhabditis elegans as a regulator of the cell-surface localization of nicastrin. APH-1 homologs in other organisms, including humans, have since been identified as components of the gamma secretase complex along with the catalytic subunit presenilin and the regulatory subunits nicastrin and PEN-2. The gamma-secretase complex is a multimeric protease responsible for the intramembrane proteolysis of transmembrane proteins such as the Notch protein and amyloid precursor protein (APP). Gamma-secretase cleavage of APP is one of two proteolytic steps required to generate the peptide known as amyloid beta, whose misfolded form is implicated in the causation of Alzheimer's disease. All of the components of the gamma-secretase complex undergo extensive post-translational modification, especially proteolytic activation; APH-1 and PEN-2 are regarded as regulators of the maturation process of the catalytic component presenilin. APH-1 contains a conserved alpha helix interaction motif glycine-X-X-X-glycine (GXXXG) that is essential to both assembly of the gamma secretase complex and to the maturation of the components.

References

External links
 

Alzheimer's disease
Proteins